is a Japanese manga written and illustrated by Yoshimi Amasaki. It is licensed in North America by 801 Media which released the manga in November 2009.

Reception
Rachel Bentham, writing for Active Anime, enjoyed the artist's conceit of having the characters suddenly "sport cat ears or dog tails" respectively for comedic effect. Jennifer Dunbar, writing for Pop Culture Shock, was impressed by the inclusion of a condom and by one character offering to be versatile because the other is uncertain about having sex with a man, but was disappointed at the too-easy forgiveness of the rape at the end of the manga.  Julie Rosato, writing for Mania, felt that most of the manga was "pure, shiny, A-grade fun", but felt that Junya's uncertainty and his rape of Atsu was out of place.

References

2007 manga
Yaoi anime and manga
Tokyopop titles
Digital Manga Publishing titles